Menziesichthys bacescui is a species of cusk eel only known from the Peru-Chile trench at depths of from .  This species was originally described as a snailfish in the family Liparidae, but has been better considered to be an ophidiid cusk eel.  This species is the only known member of its genus.

References

Ophidiidae
Monotypic fish genera
Fish described in 1971
Taxa named by Teodor T. Nalbant